The Wolryche Baronetcy, of Dudmaston in the County of Shropshire, was a title in the Baronetage of England. It was created on 4 August 1641 for Thomas Wolryche, previously Member of Parliament for Wenlock. The title became extinct on the death of the fourth Baronet in 1723.

Wolryche baronets, of Dudmaston (1641)

Sir Thomas Wolryche, 1st Baronet (1598–1668) 
Sir Francis Wolryche, 2nd Baronet (–1688)  
Sir Thomas Wolryche, 3rd Baronet (1672–1701) 
Sir John Wolryche, 4th Baronet (c. 1691–1723)

References

Extinct baronetcies in the Baronetage of England
1641 establishments in England